The LuLu cyclecar was produced by the Kearns Motor Truck Company n Beavertown, Snyder County, Pennsylvania from 1914 to 1915.

History 
The company was founded by Charles Maxwell Kearns in 1903.  Kearns was the son of a buggy maker and had a gift for invention but little more than a grade school education. He began by first mounting an engine on a buggy and progressed to more elaborate designs and heavy trucks.

The LuLu automobile was manufactured at 25 vehicles per week in 1914.  Billed as "more than a cyclecar", it had a four-cylinder monobloc engine and three-speed gearing.  It sold for $450,.

Kearns Automobiles 
The first logo for the "Kearns Kar Kompany" frames the words in the outline of the grille of a 1907 high wheeler runabout. The logo for the company boasted the car as being "Valveless, Gearless, and Clutchless".  The engine for the first vehicles was an air-cooled 3-cylinder "porcupine head" two cycle engine.  The vehicle's transmission was a friction drive, consisting of a flat spinning flywheel mounted on the engine which was set at right angles to a rubber lined steel drive wheel which slid from side to side on a drive shaft mounted in parallel to the rear axle.  Sprockets on the end of the drive shaft relayed power to the rear wheels via a pair of chains, one per wheel..

Cyclecar 
The introduction of the LuLu cyclecar in 1914 marked a change in engineering for the vehicle.  The two cycle engine was discarded in favor of the more reliable 4-stroke engine and a clutch and 3-speed transmission replaced the friction drive.  World War I caused the company to cease production. However, after the Great War, the company resumed production but shifted to making trucks, including fire trucks.

References 

Defunct motor vehicle manufacturers of the United States
Brass Era vehicles
1910s cars
Cyclecars
Motor vehicle manufacturers based in Pennsylvania
Vehicle manufacturing companies established in 1914
Vehicle manufacturing companies disestablished in 1915
Cars introduced in 1914